is a lighthouse in Iōjima, Nagasaki, Japan.

History
Iojimazaki Lighthouse was one of those designed by Richard Henry Brunton, who was hired by the government of Japan at the start of the Meiji period to help construct lighthouses to make it safe for foreign ships to come to Japan.

See also

 List of lighthouses in Japan

References

External links
Photo of Iojimazaki Lighthouse

Lighthouses completed in 1871
Lighthouses in Japan
Buildings and structures in Nagasaki Prefecture